Swing the Heartache: The BBC Sessions is a compilation album by the English gothic rock band Bauhaus, released in 1989 by Beggars Banquet Records.

Track listing
"A God in an Alcove" (4:08) – broadcast 3 Jan 1980 for John Peel
"Telegram Sam" (2:25) – broadcast 3 Jan 1980 for John Peel
"Double Dare" (4:55) – broadcast 3 Jan 1980 for John Peel
"The Spy in the Cab" (4:09) – broadcast 3 Jan 1980 for John Peel
"In the Flat Field" (3:46) – recorded for David Jensen
"St. Vitus Dance" (2:28) – recorded for David Jensen
"In Fear of Fear" (2:46) – recorded for David Jensen
"Poison Pen" (3:40) – recorded for David Jensen
"Party of the First Part" (5:35) – broadcast 12 April 1982 by John Peel
"Departure" (4:53) – broadcast 12 April 1982 by John Peel
"The Three Shadows Part II" (2:58) – broadcast 12 April 1982 by John Peel
"Silent Hedges" (3:07) – broadcast 1 July 1982 by David Jensen
"Swing the Heartache" (5:12) – broadcast 1 July 1982 by David Jensen
"Third Uncle" (5:17) – broadcast 1 July 1982 by David Jensen
"Ziggy Stardust" (3:12) – broadcast 1 July 1982 by David Jensen
"Terror Couple Kill Colonel" (3:31) – recorded 17 February 1983 for David Jensen
"Night Time" (3:11) – recorded 17 February 1983 for David Jensen
"She's in Parties" (4:41) – recorded 17 February 1983 for David Jensen

References

External links 
 

Bauhaus (band) albums
Peel Sessions recordings
1989 live albums
1989 compilation albums